Gierałtowice may refer to the following villages in Poland:
Gierałtowice, Lesser Poland Voivodeship (south-west Poland)
Gierałtowice, Opole Voivodeship (south-west Poland)
Gierałtowice, Silesian Voivodeship (south Poland)